Al-Adiyat or The War Horses which run swiftly or T.W.H.W.R.S (al-ʿādiyāt, also known as "The Courser, The Chargers") is the 100th chapter (sūrah) of the Qur'an, with 11 āyāt or verses. Regarding the timing and contextual background of the revelation (asbāb al-nuzūl), it is an earlier "Meccan surah", which means it is believed to have been revealed in Mecca, rather than later in Medina.

Summary
1-6 Oaths that man is ungrateful to his God
7-8 Man loves the things of this world
9-11 Man’s secret thoughts shall be discovered in the judgment-day 

A one liner theme of surah al-adiyat would read that this surah gives an example that horses are more grateful to their owners than men are to their Rabb (Allah).
 First five  of the surah consist of an oath as a metaphor enforcing the lesson. They describe a scene of horses charging, panting, producing sparks by their hooves, raiding at the time of dawn, stirring up the cloud of dust and arriving a gathering.
 The substantive proposition is in verses 6-8 that Man is ungrateful to his Lord and himself is a witness to it and he is immoderate in the love of worldly good.
 The last three  conclude the surah with a rhetorical question that Does the man not know about the time when contents of the graves will be resurrected and that which is in men's breasts shall be brought to light on that Day their Sustainer will show that He has always been fully aware of them.

Text

Text and meaning 

[]

In the name of Allah, the Entirely Merciful, the Especially Merciful.

[]

 By the racers, panting,

[]

 And the producers of sparks [when] striking

[]

 And the chargers at dawn,

{
[]

 Stirring up thereby [clouds of] dust,

[]

 Arriving thereby in the center collectively,

[]

 Indeed mankind, to his Lord, is ungrateful.

[]

 And indeed, he is to that a witness.

[]

 And indeed he is, in love of wealth, intense.

[]

 But does he not know that when the contents of the graves are scattered

[]

 And that within the breasts is obtained,

[]

 Indeed, their Lord with them, that Day, is [fully] Aware.

Name of the surah
Hamiduddin Farahi is a celebrated Islamic scholar of Indian subcontinent is known for his groundbreaking work on the concept of Nazm, or Coherence, in the Quran. He writes that some sūrahs have been given names after some conspicuous words used in them. Jalaluddin Al-Suyuti co-author of the classical Sunni tafsīr known as Tafsir al-Jalalayn after the word Adiyat with which it opens.

Period of revelation
Surahs in the Qur'an are not arranged in the chronological order of revelation because the order of the wahy or chronological order of revelation is not a textual part of the Quran.  Muhammad told his followers sahaba the placement in Quranic order of every Wahy revealed along with the original text of Quran. Wm Theodore de Bary, an East Asian studies expert, describes that "The final process of collection and codification of the Quran text was guided by one over-arching principle: God's words must not in any way be distorted or sullied by human intervention. For this reason, no serious attempt, apparently, was made to edit the numerous revelations, organize them into thematic units, or present them in chronological order....". The manuscript, or version, of the Quran we see today was compiled by Uthman, the third caliph (reign 644 to 656); a caliph being the political leader of a Caliphate (Islamic government).Before Uthman canonized the Quran there were different versions or codices, none of which exist today. These codices never gained general approval and were viewed by Muslims as the personal copies of individuals. However, "the search for variants in the partial versions extant before the Caliph Uthman's alleged recension in the 640s has not yielded any differences of great significance".
Whether this Surah Al-Adiyat is a Makki or a Madani is disputed. But the subject matter of the Surah and its style clearly indicate that it is not only Makki, but was revealed in the early stage of Makkan period. Abdullah bin Masud, Jabir, Hasan Basri, Ikrimah, and Ata say that it is Makki. Anas bin Malik, and Qatadah say that it is Madani; and from Ibn Abbas two views have been reported, first that it is a Makki Surah, and second that it is Madani. But the subject matter of the Surah and its style clearly indicate that it is not only Makki but was revealed in the earliest stage of Makkah. So the surah is considered to be Meccan conclusively.

Hadith
According to hadith this surah is recommended in Maghrib prayer.

 Hisham ibn Urwah said that his father used to recite the surahs like the Al-Adiyat is recited. Abu Dawud said: This indicates that those (traditions indicating long surahs) are abrogated, and this is more sound tradition.

Notes

References

External links
Quran 100 Clear Quran translation

Adiyat